Old Friends Archeological Site (also known as RI—703) is an archaeological historical site in Jamestown, Rhode Island.

The site was added in 1995 to the National Register of Historic Places.

See also
National Register of Historic Places listings in Newport County, Rhode Island

References

Archaeological sites in Rhode Island
Archaeological sites on the National Register of Historic Places in Rhode Island
Jamestown, Rhode Island
National Register of Historic Places in Newport County, Rhode Island